Adela Cortina (born 1947, Valencia) is a Spanish philosopher.

Biography
After studying philosophy and letters in the Universidad de Valencia, she was admitted into the department of metaphysics in 1969.  In 1976, she defended her doctoral thesis on the notion of God in Kant's transcendental philosophy and during some time she taught at middle schools and highschools.  A research scholarship allowed her to go to the University of Munich, where she got acquainted with critical rationalism, pragmatism and marxist ethics and, more concretely, with the philosophy of Jurgen Habermas and Karl-Otto Apel. 
Upon coming back to the Spanish scholar scene, she devoted her research time to ethics. 
In 1981, she was admitted in the department of practical philosophy in the Universidad de Valencia. 
In 1986, she became Professor of Moral Philosophy, relative to economy, business and the discrimination of women, the war, ecology, genetics, etc. These are topics that the author cultivates in her work. 
She is married to philosopher and professor at the Universidad de Valencia, Jesús Conill. 
She is a member of the Comisión Nacional de Reproducción Humana Asistida and holds a position in the Comité Asesor de Etica de la Investigación Científica y Tecnológica. 
With her book "Ethics of the friendly reason", she won the International Essay Prize Jovellanos in 2007. 
She has also been named Member of the Royal Academy of Moral and Political Science (December 2, 2008), making her the first woman admitted into this institution. She also holds an honorary position in the Universitat Jaume I de Castellón. She received this honor on January 15, 2009, as well as by the Universidad Politécnica de Cartagena on January 27, 2012.

Books
10 palabras clave en filosofía polîtica / Adela Cortina, directora ; [colaboradores, Angel Castiñeira et al.]. Estella, Navarra : Editorial Verbo Divino, 1998. 440 p. ; 22 cm. 
Etica para la sociedad civil / Adela Cortina Orts ... [et al.] ; edición coordinada por Francisco Javier Peña Echevarría. Valladolid, Spain : Universidad de Valladolid, Secretariado de Publicaciones e Intercambio Editorial, [2003?] 200 p. ; 21 cm.

See also
 Aporophobia

References
Forum Barcelona 2004: 25 / 07 / 2004, Adela Cortina (Etnor Foundation): "For a society to be a moral society means that it has to be able to anticipate the future"
Fundación ÉTNOR - Bibliografía de Adela Cortina, Directora de la Fundación ÉTNOR
politicasnet - Adela Cortina
Adela Cortina. TEDxUPValencia
TED en Español Podcast: El miedo a las personas pobres (Apple or Google) with Gerry Garbulski.

Living people
University of Valencia alumni
Spanish women philosophers
20th-century Spanish philosophers
21st-century Spanish philosophers
20th-century Spanish women
1947 births